Goldsmith is a city in Ector County, Texas, United States. The population was 257 at the 2010 census. It is part of the Odessa Metropolitan Statistical Area.

Geography

Goldsmith is located in northwestern Ector County at  (31.982441, –102.615714). Texas State Highway 158 passes through the community, leading east  to U.S. Route 385 and southwest  to Texas State Highway 302.

Demographics

As of the census of 2000, 253 people, 101 households, and 67 families resided in the city. The population density was 795.8 people per square mile (305.3/km). The 113 housing units averaged 355.4/sq mi (136.3/km). The racial makeup of the city was 88.14% White, 0.40% Native American, 9.09% from other races, and 2.37% from two or more races. Hispanics or Latinos of any race were 23.72% of the population.

Of the 101 households, 34.7% had children under the age of 18 living with them, 56.4% were married couples living together, 6.9% had a female householder with no husband present, and 32.7% were not families. About 29.7% of all households were made up of individuals, and 13.9% had someone living alone who was 65 years of age or older. The average household size was 2.50 and the average family size was 3.15.

In the city, the population was distributed as 28.1% under the age of 18, 10.7% from 18 to 24, 25.7% from 25 to 44, 19.4% from 45 to 64, and 16.2% who were 65 years of age or older. The median age was 38 years. For every 100 females, there were 110.8 males. For every 100 females age 18 and over, there were 100.0 males.

The median income for a household in the city was $38,125, and for a family was $47,321. Males had a median income of $32,000 versus $15,000 for females. The per capita income for the city was $17,237. About 7.9% of families and 13.8% of the population were below the poverty line, including 8.1% of those under the age of 18 and 28.3% of those 65 or over.

Education
Goldsmith is served by the Ector County Independent School District.

References

Cities in Ector County, Texas
Cities in Texas
Cities in Midland–Odessa